The Shultz-Funk Site (36LA7 and 36LA9) is a prehistoric archaeological site located at Manor Township, Lancaster County, Pennsylvania. It consists of two components; the Shultz component and the Funk component.  The Shultz component was first excavated in 1931, by the Pennsylvania Museum Commission.  The Shultz component was the site of a large, stockaded Susquehannock period Native American village. An extensive excavation of the Funk component in 1971, revealed three distinct Shenks Ferry villages on that site. The Shultz component is dated to 1550–1600, and the Funk component to 1500–1550.

It was listed on the National Register of Historic Places in 1982.

References

Archaeological sites on the National Register of Historic Places in Pennsylvania
Archaeological sites in Lancaster County, Pennsylvania
National Register of Historic Places in Lancaster County, Pennsylvania